Moseby is a surname. It is an alternate spelling of Mosby. Notable people with the surname include:
Lloyd Moseby (born 1959), a former Major League Baseball player
Harry Moseby, an Australian Paralympic athlete
Ulrik Moseby (born 1964), a Danish former association football player
Mr. Moseby, a character on The Suite Life of Zack & Cody and its spin-off, The Suite Life on Deck